The Global Research Council is a virtual organization through which the heads of national science funding agencies from several countries meet to discuss cooperation, review practices, and promote research on, and directions for, scientific funding worldwide.

During its Second Annual Global Meeting in May 2013, the council endorsed an Action Plan towards Open Access to Publications based on the principles of public results for public spending, researcher awareness and education, and support through a policy of open access publishing.

References

External links
 Global Research Council website

International research institutes